Jubicë is a settlement in the former Qendër municipality, Shkodër County, northern Albania. At the 2015 local government reform it became part of the municipality Malësi e Madhe. It has a population of 572.

References

Qendër, Malësi e Madhe
Populated places in Malësi e Madhe
Villages in Shkodër County